is a Japanese science fiction and adventure writer. His works have sold more than 20 million copies in Japan spread across more than 280 titles.  He is published in a variety of formats including feature films, television shows, movies and comic books.

His works are influenced by outdoor interests such as fishing, particularly Ayu fishing, mountain climbing, canoeing as well as manga, photography, pottery, art, calligraphy, martial arts.  He has published a number of photo collections of his journeys through Nepalese mountains.

He is best known for writing Jōgen no Tsuki wo Taberu Shishi (The Lion that Ate the Crescent Moon), which won both the Seiun Award and the Nihon SF Taisho Award. He also has written film scripts, including the one to Onmyoji.

One of his popular martial arts serials that has been adapted into manga is "Garouden "餓狼伝" (legend of the hungry wolf), known in the west as "The legend of the fighting wolves" that has also two videogames to date.

He's been nicknamed "The artisan of violence" due to one of his popular martial arts novel series "Shishi no Mon" (獅子の門 Gate of fierce lions) and as of 2014 he's been working on the scripts of a manga series "Shin Garouden" with renown manga artist Masami Nobe

He is also a past president of Science Fiction and Fantasy Writers of Japan.

Early life

 1951: Born on January 1 in Odawara-shi
 1973: Graduated with a degree in Japanese Literature from Tokai University
 1975: Visited Nepal for the first time
 1977: His first works were published in the science fiction coterie magazines Neo Null curated by Yasutaka Tsutsui and Uchūjin curated by Takumi Shibano.  A typographic experiment story titled Kaeru no Shi,  dubbed as "Typografiction", was published in Neo Null and received a great deal of attention within the industry.  It was reprinted in the science fiction magazine Kisou Tengai, which became his first appearance in commercial magazine.  He followed this success by releasing the novella Kyojin Den and enjoyed enough success to become a full-time author.
 1979: From the Shueisha Cobalt Collection, Nekohiki no Oruorane was published as his first stand alone title.
 1981: Futabasha Corporation published Genjū Henge, his first full-length novel.
 1982: The first volume of the Kimaira Kou Series, Genjū Shōnen Kimaira, was published by Asahi Sonorama Paperbacks.  Cover and illustrations by Yoshitaka Amano.
 1984: The Majūgari trilogy was published by Shodensha.

Collaborators
Over the span of his career, Baku Yumemakura worked with a wide range of historically important figures in the Japanese art scene.

 Yoshitaka Amano - He was in charge of stage design for Nayotake produced by Bandō Tamasaburō V, where Amano introduced him to Baku Yumemakura. The three would also collaborate on Yang Guifei, with Baku Yumemakura writing the lyrics and Yoshitaka Amano in charge of stage design. The manga Amon Saga was written by Baku Yumemakura and illustrated by Amano and was later adapted into an OVA. Among other Baku Yumemakura's works, he also did the illustrations and cover page design for Garouden, Taitei no Ken and Yamigarishi, as well as the Kimaira series. He was key visual and costume designer for movies written by Baku Yumemakura including Onmyoji (film), Onmyoji 2 and Taitei no Ken. They also collaborated on the story and pottery of Yōkihi no Bansan, for both a book and exhibition, in addition to ceramic work by Shōkoku Kanō.
 Katsuya Terada - He was in charge of the book cover and illustrations for the Kimaira series written by Baku Yumemakura, and was in charge of cover design and illustrations for Garouden, Shin Majugari, and Yamigarishi.
 Osamu Tezuka - Baku Yumemakura was influenced by one of his seminal works, Phoenix. Baku Yumemakura would go on to write the script for Boku no Son Goku.
 Reiko Okano - She is married to the Osamu Tezuka's son, Makoto Tezuka, and Onmyōji was drawn by Reiko Okano and received the Tezuka Osamu Cultural Manga Award. She went on to produce the serialized version as Onmyōji Tamatebako in the comic magazine Melody.
 Keisuke Itagaki - In 1996, he began working on Garouden, an original work by Baku Yumemakura. He has also collaborated on the series Garouden Boy.
 Ken Ishikawa - In 1994 he drew the manga  based on the Yamigarishi series, and in 1998 the manga  based on Baku Yumemakura's novel Tsuki no Ou.
 Jiro Taniguchi - Illustrated Baku Yumemakura's works, Garouden from 1989-1990 and Kamigami no itadaki (The Summit of the Gods) from 2000-2003. Kamigami no itadaki" received awards at the Angoulême International Comics Festival in 2002 and 2005.
 Yōjirō Takita - In 2001, he directed Onmyoji. It became an international hit and received a prize at The Neuchâtel International Fantastic Film Festival in 2002. He directed Onmyoji 2 in 2003.
 Yukihiko Tsutsumi - Directed Taitei no Ken, an original work by Baku Yumemakura, in 2007.
 Bandō Tamasaburō V - The dance production Yōkihi is based on the Chinese historical figure Princess Yang Guifei. Baku Yumemakura wrote the lyrics. In 1993, Baku Yumemakura wrote specially for Kabuki Sangoku denrai genjō banashi. Both of Yōkihi and Sangoku denrai genjō banashi were performed at The Kabuki-za Theater.
 Mansai Nomura - He played Abe no Seimei in Onmyoji and Onmyoji 2. He received the Best Actor prize at the Blue Ribbon Awards for his work in Onmyoji.

Translated works
 1 - (October, 2012). Demon Hunters: Desires of the Flesh

Works in print in Japanese
The following works have been released in Japan.

 (April, 1979). (Nekohiki no Oruorane)
 (December, 1980). (Kirakira Boshi no Jitta) - A Glittering Star's Jitter
 (December, 1980). (Harukanaru Kyojin) - The Far Off God
 (November, 1981). (Genjyu Henge)
 (July, 1982). (Genjyu Shonen Kimaira) - Boy Beast Chimera
 (December, 1982). (Kimaira Rouhen)
 (September, 1983). (Kimaira Garouhen)
 (February, 1984). (Majugari 1) - The Demon Hunters - Psycho Diver Series Volume 1
 (July, 1984). (Majugari 2) - The Demon Hunters - Psycho Diver Series Volume 2
 (July, 1984). (Yami Gari Shi) - The Leader of the Darkness Hunters
 (July, 1984). (Kimaira Maouhen)
 (October, 1984). (Kimaira Bosatsuhen) - Bodhisattva Chimera
 (October, 1984). (Yami Gari Shi 2) - The Leader of the Darkness Hunters 2
 (October, 1984). (Akumu Kurai) - Nightmare Consumption
 (December, 1984). (Majugari 3) - The Demon Hunters - Psycho Diver Series Volume 3
 (January, 1985). (Kaeru no Shi) - Frog's Death
 (March, 1985). (Kokoro Hoshi Tentomushi)
 (May, 1985). (Akumu Tenrankai) - Nightmare Exhibition
 (June, 1985). (Makju Kan) - The Devil's House
 (July, 1985). (Garouden 1) - Legend of the Starving Wolf
 (August, 1985). (Shishi no Mon Gunrou-hen) - The Lion's Den
 (August, 1985). (Hanjyu Shin) - Half Beast God
 (September, 1985). (Sei Jyu Ki Mourei-hen) - Blue Devil
 (October, 1985). (Kimaira Nyoraihen) - Chimera Tathagata
 (October, 1985). (Jyuouden)
 (February, 1986). (Majugari Gaiden, Seibo Ondara-hen)
 (February, 1986). (Taorete Honmou)
 (March, 1986). (Seijyuki Ishin-hen)
 (April, 1986). (Ougonkyu Bokkibutsu-hen)
 (July, 1986). (Haiena no Yoru)
 (August, 1986). (Masyou Bosatsu 1)
 (September, 1986). (Mashyou Bosatsu 2)
 (September, 1986). (Kimaira Nehanhen)
 (October, 1986). (Garouden 2)
 (November, 1986). (Shishi no Mon Genbu-hen)
 (November, 1986). (Taitei no Ken Vol.1 Tenma Kourin-hen)
 (January, 1987). (Majugari Gaiden Biku Mandara)
 (February, 1987). (Kaze Hatsuru Machi)
 (March, 1987). (Gakinokorokara Manga Manga Manga)
 (May, 1987). (Iwamura Kenji Shisyuu Aoguroi Kemono)
 (May, 1987). (Youjyu・Ayakashi no Ki)
 (June, 1987). (Kaidanji)
 (July, 1987). (Kimaira Hououhen)
 (July, 1987). (Shin　Majugari Jyokyoku Mouryou no Jyouou 1)
 (August, 1987). (Shin　Majugari Jyokyoku Mouryou no Jyouou 2)
 (August, 1987). (Jyougai Rantou de Aru)
 (November, 1987). (Kankizuki no Kujyakumai)
 (December, 1987). (Tsuki ni Yobarete Umi yori Kitaru)
 (December, 1987). (Seirou no Ken Garouden Hihen)
 (January, 1988). (Kitan Soushi)
 (April, 1988). (Garouden 3)
 (April, 1988). (Akumu de Kanpai)
 (April, 1988). (Ougonjyu 1)
 (May, 1988). (Konron no Ou Ryu no Monsyou-hen)
 (June, 1988). (Konron no Ou Ryu no Houkou-hen)
 (June, 1988). (Shishi no Mon Seiryu-hen)
 (July, 1988). (Ougonjyu 2)
 (August, 1988). (Onmyoji)
 (August, 1988). (Kakutou Hyouryu Takeki Kaze ni Tsugeyo Shisetsu UWF den)
 (October, 1988). (Genka Mandara)
 (November, 1988). (Taitei no Ken Vol.2 Youma Fukkatsu-hen)
 (December, 1988). (Kimaira Kyoubutsuhen)
 (February, 1989). (Jyukin Doushi)
 (March, 1989). (Ayu Shi)
 (May, 1989). (Tsuki no Ou)
 (May, 1989). (Hikarino Hakubutsushi)
 (August, 1989). (Jyougen no Tsuki wo Taberu Shishi)
 (September, 1989). (Ougonkyu2 Rimitsu-hen)
 (October, 1989). (Nekohiki no Oruorane, Oruorane Series)
 (October, 1989). (Garouden4)
 (October, 1989). (Gyouten Puroresu Waka Shyuu)
 (October, 1989). (Shigotoshi Tachi no Aika)
 (October, 1989). (Buddha no Hakobune)
 (November, 1989). (Kamigami no Kuni Hito no Kuni)
 (November, 1989). (Taitei no Ken Vol.3 Jinmahoukou-hen)
 (December, 1989). (Kimaira Dokkakuhen)
 (December, 1989). (Tadaima Bakudantyuu)
 (February, 1990). (Ougonkyu 3 Butsujyu-hen)
 (May, 1990). (Kouya ni Kemono Doukokusu 1 Jyuuge no Shyou)
 (May, 1990). (Tabi ni Hatetashi)
 (December, 1990). (Yumemakura Baku Atogaki Taizen)
 (January, 1991). (Chyousou no Yama)
 (February, 1991). (Gyouten Bungaku Taikei)
 (March, 1991). (Kimaira Taizouhen)
 (April, 1991). (Kiba no Monshyou)
 (October, 1991). (Konton no Shiro 1)
 (October, 1991). (Konton no Shiro 2)
 (November, 1991). (Midori no Meikyuu)
 (November, 1991). (Taitei no Ken)
 (December, 1991). (Nehan no Ou Vol.1 Jyuujin Henge・Jyama-hen)
 (January, 1992). (Nehan　no Ou Vol.2 Jyuujin Henge・Reisui-hen
 (January, 1992). (Rasen Ou)
 (March, 1992). (Kimaira Kongouhen)
 (March, 1992). (Nehan no Ou Vo.3 Jyuujin Henge・Furoukyuu-hen)
 (March, 1992). (Senritsu! Gyoukai Yougo Jiten)
 (April, 1992). (Ougon Kyuu 4 Bouryuu-hen)
 (May, 1992). (Gyouten・Bundan Waka Shyuu)
 (June, 1992). (Yumemmakura Baku Shyoujyo Mangakan)
 (July, 1992). (Shin Majugari 1 Kidou-hen)
 (October, 1992). (Oni Odori nite Sourou)
 (November, 1992). (Jyunjyou Hyouryuu)
 (December, 1992). (Taitei no Ken Vol.5 Hida Dairan-hen)
 (December, 1992). (Karatedou Bijinesumankurasu Nerimashibu)
 (February, 1993). (Garouden 5)
 (March, 1993). (Shin Majugari 2 Kujyaku-hen)
 (March, 1993). (Gyouten・Heisei Gannen no Karate Chyoppu)
 (April, 1993). (Seirakudou Suimutan)
 (June, 1993). (Kouya ni Kemono Doukokusu 2 Kyoujyuu no Shou)
 (June, 1993). (Inochi no Mizu no Monogatari)
 (July, 1993). (Kiba Nari)
 (October, 1993). (Chiheisen Monogatari)
 (October, 1993). (Nehan no Ou Kan no Jyo Genjyuhenge)
 (March, 1994). (Kimaira Bontenhen)
 (April, 1994). (Nehan no Ou Vol.4 Shinjyuhenge・Mara-hen)
 (June, 1994). (Gunrou no Hata)
 (August, 1994). (Etsuraku no Tabibito)
 (September, 1994). (Saizou Kairou)
 (October, 1994). (Yumemakura Baku no Gedou Kyouyou Bunko)
 (October, 1994). (Tsuri ni Tsurarete)
 (January, 1995). (Sonohi Gurashi no Techou)
 (March, 1995). (Garouden6)
 (April, 1995). (Ruri no Hakobune)
 (April, 1995). (Kenran taru Sagi)
 (June, 1995). (Onmyoji Hiten no Maki)
 (June, 1995). (Honokana Yoru no Gensoutan)
 (July, 1995). (Shin Majugari 3 Tsuchigumo-hen)
 (October, 1995). (Seihari no Yama)
 (October, 1995). (Kitan Carnival)
 (December, 1995). (Garouden 7)
 (February, 1996). (Nekomachi Tsukiyo Sonohigurashi no Techou 2)
 (March, 1996). (Nehan no Ou Vol.5 Jinjyuhenge・Genki-hen)
 (April, 1996). (Nehan no Ou Vol.6 Jinjyuhenge・Kakushakourin-hen)
 (April, 1996). (Nekohiki no Oruorane Kanzenban)
 (June, 1996). (Ameharete Tsuki ha Mourou no Yoru)
 (June, 1996). (Yami Gari Shi)
 (July, 1996). (Garouden 8)
 (October, 1996). (Futaro no E)
 (November, 1996). (Honchyou Musou Kakutouka Retsuden)
 (January, 1997). ((Kouya ni Kemono Doukokusu 3 Jyuou no Shyou)
 (February, 1997). (Honjitsu Tsuri Biyori Tyoukoutaizen)
 (April, 1997). (Garouden 9)
 (June, 1997). (Shin Majugari 4 Kyouou-hen)
 (August, 1997). (ULUTIMATE)
 (August, 1997). (Kamigami no Itadaki Vol.1)
 (August, 1997). (Kamigami no Itadaki Vol.2)
 (August, 1997). (Youranki no Matsuri)
 (August, 1997). (Tsuri Tokidoki Shigoto)
 (October, 1997). (Honjitsu mo Yumemi Gokochi)
 (November, 1997). (Onmyoji Tsukumogami no Maki)
 (January, 1998). (Shin Majugari 5 Kijin-hen)
 (February, 1998). (Garouden 10)
 (February, 1998). (Hitsuji no Uchyu)
 (March, 1998). (Kimaira Enseihen)
 (April, 1998). (Heisei Koushyaku Abe no Seimei Den)
 (May, 1998). (Kukimakura Buku Sensei Taiheiki)
 (August, 1998). (Nananin no Abe no Seimei)
 (January, 1999). (Gyouten・Yumemakura Baku Tokubetsugou)
 (February, 1999). (Garou Den 11)
 (April, 1999). (Shin Majugari 6 Madou-hen)
 (October, 1999). (Kajitsu no Mori Vol.1 Bungei-hen)
 (October, 1999). (Kajitsu no Mori Vol.2　Comic・SF-hen)
 (February, 2000). (Kimaira Gunrouhen)
 (March, 2000). (Nananib no En no Ozuno)
 (April, 2000). (Kouya ni Kemono Doukokusu 4　Kijyu no Shyou)
 (April, 2000). (Onmyoji Namanari Hime)
 (May, 2000). (Kouya ni Kemono Doukokusu 5 Kanketsu-hen/Jyuujin no Shyou)
 (June, 2000). (Toujin Retsuden)
 (June, 2000). (Onmyoji Houou no Maki)
 (July, 2000). (B-1 Zaurusu　no Hai)
 (July, 2000). (Garou Den Kakutou Shinken Densetsu)
 (August, 2000). (KUROZUKA)
 (August, 2000). (Nehan no Ou 1 Genjyu Henge)
 (August, 2000). (Nehan no Ou 2 Shinjyu Henge Jyama-hen Reisui-hen)
 (September, 2000). (Nehan no Ou 3 Shinjyu Henge FUroukyuu-hen Mara-hen)
 (October, 2000). (Yume no Karyuudo the sandman)
 (October, 2000). (Kusariyuku Tenshi)
 (December, 2000). (Nehan no Ou 4 Shinjyu Henge Genki-hen Kakushyakourin-hen)
 (December, 2000). (Kimaira 1 Genjyu Shyounen Oborohen)
 (January, 2001). (Kimaira 2 Garouhen Maouhen)
 (February, 2001). (Ayashi no Sekai)
 (March, 2001). (Kimaira 3 Bosatsu-hen Nyorai-hen)
 (March, 2001). (Garou Den 12)
 (May, 2001). (Kimaira 4 Nehanhen Hououhen)
 (May, 2001). (Garou Den Saikyou Kakutougi Sahou)
 (June, 2001). (Shin Majugari 7 Kimon-hen)
 (July, 2001). (Kimaira 5 Kyoubutsuhen Dokkakuhen)
 (August, 2001). (Monoiu Gaikotsu)
 (August, 2001). (Kitan Zoushi)
 (September, 2001). (Kimaira 6 Taizouhen Kongouhen)
 (September, 2001). (Onmyo Yawa)
 (October, 2001). (Onmyoji Kobutori Seimei)
 (November, 2001). (Toushirou)
 (November, 2001). (Kimaira 7 Bontenhen Enshyouhen)
 (December, 2001). (Yami Gari Shi 0 Koushiki Dokuhon)
 (February, 2002). (Onmyoji Ryuuteki no Maki)
 (March, 2002). (Shishi no Mon Sujyaku-hen)
 (March, 2002). (Kimaira Shyougetsu hen)
 (September, 2002). (Kimaira 7 Gunrouhen Shyougetsuhen)
 (November, 2002). (Taitei no Ken Tenma no Shyou Tenma Kourin-hen/Youma Fukkatsu-hen)
 (November, 2002). (Taitei no Ken 2 Tenma no Shyou Jinma Houkou-hen/Kyouma Shyuurai-hen)
 (March, 2003). (Garou Den 13)
 (April, 2003). (Onmyoji Taikyoku no Maki)
 (April, 2003). (Kouyani Kemono Doukokusu Kanzenban)
 (May, 2003). (Shin Majugari 8 Ushitora-hen)
 (August, 2003). (Matarajin no Nie)
 (September, 2003). (Onmyoji Dokuhon)
 (October, 2003). (Onmyoji Kubi)
 (February, 2004). (Garou Den BOY Super Guide)
 (April, 2004). (Shishi no Mon Byakko-hen)
 (April, 2004). (Kukai Mandara)
 (July, 2004). (Samon Kukai Tou no Kuni nite Oni to Utagesu Vol.1)
 (July, 2004). (Samon Kukai Tou no Kuni nite Oni to Utagesu Vol.2)
 (July, 2004). (Majugari New edition)
 (August, 2004). (Samon Kukai Tou no Kuni nite Oni to Utagesu Vol.3)
 (September, 2004). (Samon Kukai Tou no Kuni nite Oni to Utagesu Vol.4)
 (September, 2004). (Tatsujin ga Erabu Jyosei no Tame no Manga Bunko)
 (November, 2004). (Shinan Vol.1)
 (November, 2004). (Shinan Vol.2)
 (November, 2004). (Shin Majugari 9 Kyouryuu-hen)
 (April, 2005). (Nihon SF Meisaku Shyuusei)
 (June, 2005). (Onmyoji Kanawa)
 (August, 2005). (Shiru wo Tanoshimu Konohito Konosekai Yumemakura Baku no Kisouka Retsuden)
 (September, 2005). (Onmyoji Takiyashyahime Vol.1)
 (September, 2005). (Onmyoji Takiyashyahime Vol.2)
 (December, 2005). (Garou Den Breakblow Kanzen Kakutou Shinan)
 (January, 2006). (Rakugo Subaru Yose)
 (February, 2006). (Kimaira Seiryuuhen)
 (March, 2006). (Shishi no Mon Unryuu-hen)
 (April, 2006). (Atsui Gensou Yumemakura Baku Zenshigoto)
 (April, 2006). (Harima Onmyoji Kikou)
 (May, 2006). (Youkihi)
 (June, 2006). (Shin Majugari 10 Kukai-hen)
 (November, 2006). (Kakutouteki Nichijyou Seikatsu)
 (November, 2006). (Shinsou Garou Den the Bound Volume 1)
 (November, 2006). (Shinsou Garou Den the Bound Volume 2)
 (November, 2006). (Biwa Kidan)
 (December, 2006). (Shin Garou Den Vol.1 Hiden Kikushiki-hen)
 (December, 2006). (Shinsou Garou Den the Bound Volume 3)
 (December, 2006). (Shinsou Garou Den the Bound Volume 4)
 (February, 2007). (Taitei no Ken 1 Tenma Kourin-hen・Youma Fukkatsu-hen)
 (March, 2007). (Taitei no Ken 2 Jinma Houkou-hen・Kyouma Shyuurai-hen)
 (April, 2007). (Taitei no Ken 3 Hida Dairan-hen・Tenma Boukyou-hen)
 (April, 2007). (Eiga Taitei no Ken Koushiki Guide book)
 (June, 2007). (Onmyoji Yakouhai no Maki)
 (June, 2007). (Zoku Kakutouteki Nichijyou Seikatsu)
 (July, 2007). (Amen Houshi)
 (September, 2007). (Unchiku Zuki　no Tame no Kakutoubanashi)
 (February, 2008). (Bakusan no Pochi Bukuro)
 (May, 2008). (Mainichi Tsuri Biyori)
 (September, 2008). (Shin Majugari 11 Chiryuu-hen)
 (October, 2008). (Touten no Shishi Vol.1 Ten no Maki・Kanouryuu Jyuujyutsu)
 (October, 2008). (Touten no Shishi Vol.2 Ten no Maki・Kanouryuu Jyuujyutsu)
 (November, 2008). (Touten no Shishi Vol.3 Ten no Maki・Kanouryuu Jyuujyutsu)
 (November, 2008). (Orokamono no Tsue Gotairiku Tyougyo Kikou)
 (December, 2008). (Touten no Shishi Vol.4 Ten no Maki・Kanouryuu Jyuujyutsu)
 (June, 2009). (Yami Gari Shi Ousekikou no Inu)
 (September, 2009). (Yami Gari Shi <Shinsou Ban>)
 (August, 2009). (Yami Gari Shi Seijyuuki <Shinsou ban>)
 (September, 2009). (Yami Gari Shi Konron no Ou <Shinsou Ban>)
 (January, 2010). (Onmyoji Tenko no Maki)
 (February, 2010). (Samon Kukai Tou no Kuni nite Oni to Utagesu Vol.1)
 (February, 2010). (Samon Kukai Tou no Kuni nite Oni to Utagesu Vol.2)
 (March, 2010). (Samon Kukai Tou no Kuni nite Oni to Utagesu Vol.3)
 (March, 2010). (Samon Kukai Tou no Kuni nite Oni to Utagesu Vol.4)
 (March, 2010). (Shishi no Mon 7 Jinrou-hen)
 (April, 2010). (Gesshinsai)
 (April, 2010). (Youkihi no Bansan)
 (July, 2010). (Majugari New Edition)
 (July, 2010). (Tenkai no Hihou Vol.1)
 (July, 2010). (Tenkai no Hihou Vol.2)
 (July, 2010). (Majugari Gaiden)
 (August, 2010). (Toukan Ou YuuYuu Nikki)
 (August, 2010). (Kimaira 9 Genjyouhen)
 (September, 2010). (Shin Majugari Jyokyoku)
 (November, 2010). (Shin Majugari Kanketsu-hen Waou no Shiro Vol.1)
 (November, 2010). (Shin Majugari Kanketsu-hen Waou no Shiro Vol.2)
 (May, 2011). (Onmyoji Daigo no Maki)
 (July, 2011). (Oyedo Chokakuden Vol.1)
 (July, 2011). ((Oyedo Chokakuden Vol.2)
 (December, 2011). (Okina)
 (April, 2012). (Yobu Yama)
 (June, 2012). (Taitei no Ken 4 Genma Rakurui-hen)
 (June, 2012). (Taitei no Ken 5 Genma Rakurui-hen)

References

The Encyclopedia of Science Fiction page 641
 Garouden

External links
SFWJ
J'Lit | Authors : Baku Yumemakura | Books from Japan 

1951 births
Living people
Japanese science fiction writers
Japanese screenwriters
Tokai University alumni
People from Odawara
Writers from Kanagawa Prefecture